Mihály Korom (9 October 1927 - 3 October 1993) was a Hungarian politician and jurist, who served as Minister of Justice between 1966 and 1978.

References
 Magyar Életrajzi Lexikon

1927 births
1993 deaths
Hungarian communists
Justice ministers of Hungary
Members of the National Assembly of Hungary (1985–1990)